The Brooklyn Hebrew Orphan Asylum was an orphanage constructed in Brooklyn, New York. The Brooklyn Hebrew Orphan Asylum branched off from the Hebrew Orphan Asylum of New York when that organization narrowed its support to children in Manhattan. The Brooklyn organization was created by philanthropic members of Temple Israel and K.K. Beth Elohim. Among those who spent part of their childhood there are Hannah Tompkins and eden ahbez.

References

External links
Guide to the Records of Brooklyn Hebrew Orphan Asylum at the American Jewish Historical Society, New York.

Residential buildings in Brooklyn
Orphanages in New York (state)
Jewish orphanages
Jews and Judaism in Brooklyn
Jewish organizations based in New York City